Coralastele is a genus of sea snails, marine gastropod mollusks, in the family Calliostomatidae within the superfamily Trochoidea, the top snails, turban snails and their allies.

Species
Species within the genus Coralastele include:
 Coralastele allanae Iredale, 1930
 Coralastele pulcherrima (G. B. Sowerby III, 1914)
The following species were brought into synonymy:
 Coralastele emigrans Nordsieck, 1972

References

Calliostomatidae
Monotypic gastropod genera